Beck's Run School (also known as Dower's Tavern) located at 1000 Becks Run Road in the Arlington Heights neighborhood of Pittsburgh, Pennsylvania, was built in 1899.  This former two story and two room school house was used almost up until World War II.  It later became known as Dower's Tavern (currently "Down the Road Saloon").  It was added to the List of City of Pittsburgh historic designations on September 28, 1987.

References

City of Pittsburgh historic designations
Schools in Pittsburgh
School buildings completed in 1899
1899 establishments in Pennsylvania